William Franklin Love (March 29, 1850 – October 16, 1898) was a U.S. representative from Mississippi.

Born near Liberty in Amite County, Mississippi, Love attended the common schools and the University of Mississippi at Oxford.
He engaged in agricultural pursuits.
He served as member of the Mississippi House of Representatives from 1878 to 1882 and from 1884 to 1888.
He served in the Mississippi State Senate from 1889 to 1896.
He served as delegate to the State constitutional convention in 1890.

Love was elected as a Democrat to the Fifty-fifth Congress and served from March 4, 1897, until his death in Gloster, Mississippi, October 16, 1898.
He was interred in Gloster Cemetery.

See also
List of United States Congress members who died in office (1790–1899)

References

1850 births
1898 deaths
People from Amite County, Mississippi
Democratic Party Mississippi state senators
Democratic Party members of the Mississippi House of Representatives
University of Mississippi alumni
Democratic Party members of the United States House of Representatives from Mississippi
19th-century American politicians
People from Gloster, Mississippi